Frank Coombs was an American football and basketball coach.  He was the head football coach at Adrian College in Adrian, Michigan for one season, in 1914, compiling a record of 3–3.  Coombs was also the head basketball coach at Adrian in 1914–15, tallying a mark of 3–10.

Head coaching record

Football

References

Year of birth missing
Year of death missing
Adrian Bulldogs football coaches
Adrian Bulldogs men's basketball coaches